Newport Rebels is an album by various artists released under the Jazz Artists Guild, led by bassist Charles Mingus and drummer Max Roach, that was recorded in November 1960 and released on the Candid label.

Reception

The contemporaneous DownBeat reviewer commented: "One of the non-insignificant faults of this album is a looseness that induces sloppy playing", and identified Jones as the main culprit. AllMusic reviewer Scott Yanow states: "In 1960 bassist Charles Mingus helped to organize an alternative Newport Jazz Festival in protest of Newport's conservative and increasingly commercial booking policy. The music on this LP (which has been reissued on CD) features some of the musicians who participated in Mingus's worthy if short-lived venture".

Track listing
 "Mysterious Blues" (Charles Mingus) - 8:35
 "Cliff Walk" (Booker Little) - 9:37
"Wrap Your Troubles In Dreams" (Harry Barris) - 3:47
 "Tain't Nobody's Bizness If I Do" (Everett Robbins, Porter Grainger) - 7:11
 "Me and You" (Charles Mingus, Jo Jones, Roy Eldridge, Tommy Flanagan) - 9:46

Personnel
Roy Eldridge (tracks 1, 3 & 5), Booker Little (track 2), Benny Bailey (track 4)  - trumpet
Jimmy Knepper (track 1), Julian Priester (track 2) - trombone 
Eric Dolphy - alto saxophone (tracks 1 & 4)
Walter Benton - tenor saxophone (track 2)
Tommy Flanagan (tracks 1, 3 & 5), Kenny Dorham (track 4) - piano
Charles Mingus (tracks 1, 3 & 5), Peck Morrison (tracks 2 & 4) – bass
Jo Jones (all tracks), Max Roach (track 2) - drums
Abbey Lincoln - vocals (track 4)

References 

1960 albums
Charles Mingus albums
Candid Records albums